In host–guest chemistry, an inclusion compound (also known as an inclusion complex) is a  chemical complex in which one chemical compound (the "host") has a cavity into which a "guest" compound can be accommodated.  The interaction between the host and guest involves purely van der Waals bonding.  The definition of inclusion compounds is very broad, extending to channels formed between molecules in a crystal lattice in which guest molecules can fit.

Examples and case studies

Calixarenes
Calixarenes and related formaldehyde-arene condensates are one class of hosts that form inclusion compounds.  One famous illustration is the adduct with cyclobutadiene, which otherwise is unstable.

Cyclodextrins
Cyclodextrins are well established hosts for the formation of inclusion compounds. Illustrative is the case of ferrocene which is inserted into the cyclodextrin at 100 °C under hydrothermal conditions.

Cyclodextrin also forms inclusion compounds with fragrances. As a result, the fragrance molecules have a reduced vapor pressure and are more stable towards exposure to light and air. When incorporated into textiles the fragrance lasts much longer due to the slow-release action.

Non-examples
Cryptands and crown ethers typically do not form inclusion complexes since the guest is bound by forces stronger than van der Waals bonding.   If the guest is enclosed on all sides so that it is 'trapped', the compound is known as a clathrate, not an inclusion complex. In molecular encapsulation, a guest molecule is trapped inside another molecule.

References 

Supramolecular chemistry